C More First HD is a high-definition television channel owned by C More Entertainment showing movies and television series in the Nordic countries.

The channel was launched as C More HD on 1 September 2005. It was then the first HDTV channel targeting the Nordic countries broadcasting with MPEG-2 compression from the Thor 2 satellite and MPEG-4 with cable on the Canal Digital platform. The content consisted of three movies every evening. On 1 November 2006, it was rebranded as Canal+ HD and is now broadcasting H.264.

The Swedish cable distributor Com Hem launched HDTV on 12 December 2006 and then included Canal+ HD in its offerings. In early February 2007, C More launched another HD channel. Canal+ HD was then renamed Canal+ Film HD and the new channel was named Canal+ Sport HD.

See also 
 Canal+
 C More First
 C More Hits
 C More Action
 Canal+ Sport
 Canal+ Sport 2

References

Pan-Nordic television channels
Television stations in Denmark
Television channels in Sweden